Endorphin is a dynamic motion synthesis software package developed by NaturalMotion. Endorphin can be used to generate computer simulations of large numbers of independent 
characters interacting with each other and the world according to brief scripts or 'behaviours'. It combines physics, AI, and genetic algorithms to create realistic animations. Unlike Euphoria, also developed by NaturalMotion, Endorphin is not an engine, but a 3D animation tool for Microsoft Windows.

At the heart of the software is an adaptive behaviors module which assigns context-sensitive motions to characters based on their surroundings --- for example, football players could be programmed to automatically tackle when near another player, or a swordsman could swing to attack nearby enemies. This automatic behaviour generation differentiates the software from competitors, and reduces the burden on animators to individually select behaviours for each agent in a large scene.

Registered users on Naturalmotion's website can attain a free learning edition of Endorphin, however it lacks the feature to export the animation to popular CAD Software, a feature only available in the full version of the program.

It has been used in movies and video games such as Troy, Poseidon and Tekken 5. As of 2014, Endorphin is no longer supported by NaturalMotion. The software is unavailable for purchase, and the user community has been removed from the company's website.

References

External links
Official Endorphin Website
Natural Motion Website
Free Endorphin Learning Edition Software

3D graphics software
Animation software
Windows graphics-related software